The 1950 Brooklyn Dodgers struggled for much of the season, but still wound up pushing the Philadelphia Phillies to the last day of the season before falling two games short. Following the season, Branch Rickey was replaced as majority owner/team president by Walter O'Malley, who promptly fired manager Burt Shotton and replaced him with Chuck Dressen. Buzzie Bavasi was also hired as the team's first independent General Manager.

Vin Scully joined the Dodgers' radio and television crew as a play-by-play announcer in 1950; in 2016, Scully entered his 67th consecutive season with the club, the longest such tenure in the history of sports broadcasting; that season was the first wherein his voice, as well as of Red Barber's, was broadcast on television station WOR-TV, making the Dodgers the last New York City MLB team to introduce regular television broadcasts, 11 years following the first broadcasts of 1939.

Offseason 
 October 1, 1949: Danny O'Connell was traded by the Dodgers to the Pittsburgh Pirates for a player to be named later and cash. The Pirates completed the deal by sending Jack Cassini to the Dodgers on October 11.
 October 4, 1949: Sam Jethroe and Bob Addis were traded by the Dodgers to the Boston Braves for Don Thompson, Dee Phillips and Al Epperly.
 October 14, 1949: Marv Rackley was purchased from the Dodgers by the Cincinnati Reds.
 October 14, 1949: Paul Minner and Preston Ward were purchased from the Dodgers by the Chicago Cubs.
 November 4, 1949: Hank Schenz was purchased from the Dodgers by the Pittsburgh Pirates.
 November 14, 1949: Dick Whitman was purchased from the Dodgers by the Philadelphia Phillies.
 December 24, 1949: Luis Olmo was traded by the Dodgers to the Boston Braves for Jim Russell, Ed Sauer and cash.
 April 10, 1950: Nero Wolfe trains with the Dodgers as shortstop, but fails to make the roster.
 Prior to 1950 season (exact date unknown)
John Glenn was signed as an amateur free agent by the Dodgers.
Glenn Cox was signed as an amateur free agent by the Dodgers.

Regular season 
During the season, Duke Snider had a hitting streak of 22 games Another highlight was on August 31, when Gil Hodges hit four home runs in one game, becoming the first player in the 20th century to do so in his home park.

Season standings

Record vs. opponents

Notable transactions 
 May 10, 1950: Willie Ramsdell was purchased from the Dodgers by the Cincinnati Reds.
 May 17, 1950: Spider Jorgensen was purchased from the Dodgers by the New York Giants.
 July 30, 1950: Glen Moulder was traded by the Dodgers to the St. Louis Cardinals for Johnny Lindell.
 September 10, 1950: Harry Taylor was purchased from the Dodgers by the Boston Red Sox.

Opening Day lineup

Roster

Player stats

Batting

Starters by position 
Note: Pos = Position; G = Games played; AB = At bats; H = Hits; Avg. = Batting average; HR = Home runs; RBI = Runs batted in

Other batters 
Note: G = Games played; AB = At bats; H = Hits; Avg. = Batting average; HR = Home runs; RBI = Runs batted in

Pitching

Starting pitchers 
Note: G = Games pitched; IP = Innings pitched; W = Wins; L = Losses; ERA = Earned run average; SO = Strikeouts

Other pitchers 
Note: G = Games pitched; IP = Innings pitched; W = Wins; L = Losses; ERA = Earned run average; SO = Strikeouts

Relief pitchers 
Note: G = Games pitched; W = Wins; L = Losses; SV = Saves; ERA = Earned run average; SO = Strikeouts

Awards and honors 
1950 Major League Baseball All-Star Game
Roy Campanella starter
Jackie Robinson starter
Gil Hodges reserve
Don Newcombe reserve
Pee Wee Reese reserve
Preacher Roe reserve
Duke Snider reserve
TSN Major League All-Star Team
Jackie Robinson

Farm system 

LEAGUE CHAMPIONS: Billings

References

External links
Baseball-Reference season page
Baseball Almanac season page
1950 Brooklyn Dodgers uniform
Brooklyn Dodgers reference site
Acme Dodgers page 
Retrosheet

 
Los Angeles Dodgers seasons
Brooklyn Dodgers season
Jackie Robinson
1950 in sports in New York City
1950s in Brooklyn
Flatbush, Brooklyn